Eupatorium benguetense is a plant species in the family Asteraceae.

References

benguetense